Tissue factor, also called platelet tissue factor, factor III, or CD142, is a protein encoded by the F3 gene, present in subendothelial tissue and leukocytes. Its role in the clotting process is the initiation of thrombin formation from the zymogen prothrombin. Thromboplastin defines the cascade that leads to the activation of factor X—the tissue factor pathway. In doing so, it has replaced the previously named extrinsic pathway in order to eliminate ambiguity.

Function 

The F3 gene encodes coagulation factor III, which is a cell surface glycoprotein. This factor enables cells to initiate the blood coagulation cascades, and it functions as the high-affinity receptor for the coagulation factor VII. The resulting complex provides a catalytic event that is responsible for initiation of the coagulation protease cascades by specific limited proteolysis. Unlike the other cofactors of these protease cascades, which circulate as nonfunctional precursors, this factor is a potent initiator that is fully functional when expressed on cell surfaces. There are three distinct domains of this factor: extracellular, transmembrane, and cytoplasmic. This protein is the only one in the coagulation pathway for which a congenital deficiency has not been described. In addition to the membrane-bound tissue factor, soluble form of tissue factor was also found which results from alternatively spliced tissue factor mRNA transcripts, in which exon 5 is absent and exon 4 is spliced directly to exon 6.

Coagulation 

TF is the cell surface receptor for the serine protease factor VIIa.

The best known function of tissue factor is its role in blood coagulation. The complex of TF with factor VIIa catalyzes the conversion of the inactive protease factor X into the active protease factor Xa.

Together with factor VIIa, tissue factor forms the extrinsic pathway of coagulation. This is opposed to the intrinsic (amplification) pathway, which involves both activated factor IX and factor VIII. Both pathways lead to the activation of factor X (the common pathway), which combines with activated factor V in the presence of calcium and phospholipid to produce thrombin (thromboplastin activity).

Cytokine signaling 
TF is related to a protein family known as the cytokine receptor class II family. The members of this receptor family are activated by cytokines. Cytokines are small proteins that can influence the behavior of white blood cells. Binding of VIIa to TF has also been found to start signaling processes inside the cell. The signaling function of TF/VIIa plays a role in angiogenesis and apoptosis. Pro-inflammatory and pro-angiogenic responses are activated by TF/VIIa mediated-cleavage by the protease-activated receptor 2 (PAR2). EphB2 and EphA2 of the Eph tyrosine kinase receptor (RTK) family can also be cleaved by TF/VIIa.

Structure 
Tissue factor belongs to the cytokine receptor protein superfamily and consists of three domains:

 an extracellular domain, which consists of two fibronectin type III modules whose hydrophobic cores merge in the domain-domain interface. This serves as a (probably rigid) template for factor VIIa binding. 
 a transmembrane domain.
 a cytosolic domain of 21 amino acids length inside the cell which is involved in the signaling function of TF.

Note that one of factor VIIa's domains, GLA domain, binds in the presence of calcium to negatively charged phospholipids, and this binding greatly enhances factor VIIa binding to tissue factor.

Tissue distribution 
Some cells release TF in response to blood vessel damage (see next paragraph) and some do only in response to inflammatory mediators (endothelial cells/macrophages).

TF is expressed by cells which are normally not exposed to flowing blood, such as sub-endothelial cells (e.g. smooth muscle cells) and cells surrounding blood vessels (e.g. fibroblasts). This can change when the blood vessel is damaged by, for example, physical injury or rupture of atherosclerotic plaques. Exposure of TF-expressing cells during injury allows the complex formation of TF with factor VII. Factor VII and TF form an equimolar complex in the presence of calcium ions, leading to the activation of factor VII on a membrane surface.

The inner surface of the blood vessel consists of endothelial cells. Endothelial cells do not express TF except when they are exposed to inflammatory molecules such as tumor necrosis factor-alpha (TNF-alpha). Another cell type that expresses TF on the cell surface in inflammatory conditions is the monocyte (a white blood cell).

Thromboplastin 
Historically, thromboplastin was a lab reagent, usually derived from placental sources, used to assay prothrombin times (PT time). Thromboplastin, by itself, could activate the extrinsic coagulation pathway. When manipulated in the laboratory, a derivative could be created called partial thromboplastin, which was used to measure the intrinsic pathway. This test is called the aPTT, or activated partial thromboplastin time. It was not until much later that the subcomponents of thromboplastin and partial thromboplastin were identified. Thromboplastin contains phospholipids as well as tissue factor, both of which are needed in the activation of the extrinsic pathway, whereas partial thromboplastin does not contain tissue factor. Tissue factor is not needed to activate the intrinsic pathway.

Interactions 
Tissue factor has been shown to interact with Factor VII.

Additional images

See also 
 Hemostasis

References

Further reading

External links 
 
 —March 2006
 PDBe-KB provides an overview of all the structure information available in the PDB for Human Tissue factor

CD142
Coagulation system